Bukwałd  is a village in northern Poland. It is located in the administrative district of Gmina Dywity, within Olsztyn County, Warmian-Masurian Voivodeship. It is located on the north-eastern shore of Bukwałdzkie Lake in Warmia.

The village has a population of 315.

References

Populated lakeshore places in Poland
Villages in Olsztyn County